Heru-ra-ha  is a composite deity within Thelema, a religion that began in 1904 with Aleister Crowley and his Book of the Law. Heru-ra-ha is composed of Ra-Hoor-Khuit and Hoor-paar-kraat. He is associated with the other two major Thelemic deities found in The Book of the Law, Nuit and Hadit, who are also godforms related to ancient Egyptian mythology. Their stelae link Nuit and Hadit to the established ancient Egyptian deities Nut and Hor-Bhdt (Horus of Edfu).

Active aspect
The active aspect of Heru-ra-ha is Ra-Hoor-Khuit (sometimes also anglicized as Ra-Hoor-Khu-it,  Ra-Har-Khuti, or Ra-Har-Akht; Egyptological pronunciation: Ra-Horakhty or Ra-Herakhty), means 'Ra (who is) Horus of the Horizon'. Ra-Hoor-Khuit or Ra-Hoor-Khut is the speaker in the third chapter of The Book of the Law. Some quotes from his Chapter, (in particular verse 35, where the name appears):

 "Now let it be first understood that I am a god of War and of Vengeance." (AL III:3)
 "Fear not at all; fear neither men nor Fates, nor gods, nor anything. Money fear not, nor laughter of the folk folly, nor any other power in heaven or upon the earth or under the earth. Nu is your refuge as Hadit your light; and I am the strength, force, vigour, of your arms." (AL III:17)
 "The half of the word of Heru-ra-ha, called Hoor-pa-kraat and Ra-Hoor-Khut." (AL III:35)
 "I am the warrior Lord of the Forties: the Eighties cower before me, & are abased. I will bring you to victory & joy: I will be at your arms in battle & ye shall delight to slay. Success is your proof; courage is your armour; go on, go on, in my strength; & ye shall turn not back for any!" (AL III:46)
 "There is no law beyond Do what thou wilt." (AL III:60)

Within Thelema, Ra-Hoor-Khuit is called 'Lord of the Aeon' (which began in 1904 according to Thelemic doctrine), and 'The Crowned and Conquering Child'. An appellation of Ra, identifying him with Horus, this name shows the two as manifestations of the singular solar force. According to Crowley, the five-pointed "star of flame" symbolizes Ra-Hoor-Khuit in certain contexts.

"Khuit" also refers to a local form of the goddess Hathor at Athribis, who guarded the heart of Osiris. "Khut" refers to the goddess Isis as light giver of the new year; some older sources say that it can also refer to the fiery serpent on the crown of Ra.

Passive aspect
The passive aspect of Heru-ra-ha is Hoor-pa-kraat (meaning "Horus the Child"; Egyptological pronunciation: Har-pa-khered), more commonly referred to by the Greek rendering Harpocrates; Horus, the son of Isis and Osiris, sometimes distinguished from their brother Horus the Elder,  who was the old patron deity of Upper Egypt. Hoor is represented as a young boy with a child's sidelock of hair, sucking his finger. The Greeks, Ovid, and the Hermetic Order of the Golden Dawn attributed silence to him, presumably because the sucking of the finger is suggestive of the common "shhh"-gesture.

Aiwass, the being who dictated The Book of the Law to Crowley, introduces himself as "the minister of Hoor-paar-kraat" in the book's first chapter.

Also known as "The Babe in the Lotus", Hoor-paar-kraat is sometimes thought of as the younger brother of Horus. The former interpretation in the works of Aleister Crowley portrays Ra-Hoor-Khuit—in place of the Golden Dawn's Osiris/Jesus—as a model for the initiate, and thus describes attainment as a natural growth process, de-emphasizing the metaphor of death and resurrection. In the second interpretation, the Golden Dawn placed Hoor-paar-kraat at the center of their Hall of Ma'at while the officers of the temple (one of whom represented Horus) revolved around him.

Combined form
The "Cry of the First Aethyr which is called LIL" in Crowley's The Vision and the Voice presents Horus, the Crowned and Conquering Child, as the union of many opposites:

See also
  Astrotheology
Laws of Form
  Mark and space

References

Citations

Works cited

Further reading
 

Magic deities
New religious movement deities
Thelema